Wavelength is a music series and annual festival held in Toronto, Ontario, Canada. The project was founded in 2000 by Jonny Dovercourt, Duncan MacDonell (Doc Pickles), and Derek Westerholm. It was founded on the basis that many others would share their enthusiasm for independent music from Toronto. The concept evolved from an open-table meeting of musicians and enthusiasts on September 11, 1999, this then developed into a weekly Sunday showcase and annual festival.

The first instalment of the music series took place February 13, 2000 at Ted's Wrecking Yard, featuring Toronto legends Mean Red Spiders and Neck. Wavelength became well known as a hotbed for Toronto's creative music community and featured breakout shows by such notable Canadian bands Broken Social Scene and The Constantines. During Wavelength's second month Canadian artist Michael Snow personally screened his legendary 1967 piece "Wavelength" before his performance at Ted's Wrecking Yard. Wavelength moved to Sneaky Dee's in 2002, finally moving to the Garrison in 2009 to complete the run of the Sunday showcases at exactly 500, 10 years to the date of the series' launch. Wavelength currently organizes a series of special music events, including the yearly ALL CAPS! Island Festival.

Artists representing a wide range of genres have performed at Wavelength ranging from Feist, The Constantines, Broken Social Scene, Peaches, Ghost Bees, Exhaust, Do Make Say Think, Ethiopian saxophonist Getatchew Mekurya, Sook-Yin Lee, and Canadian hip hop artist Cadence Weapon. During its first decade, more than 1100 bands have played Wavelength.

Wavelength incorporated as a not-for-profit as Wavelength Music Arts Projects in 2007.

Wavelength is currently programmed by Jonny Dovercourt and guest curator Ian Steaman, and it continues to present music events in and around Toronto.

References
Citations

External links
Wavelength Music Arts Projects Official homepage

Recurring events established in 2000
Rock festivals in Canada
Music festivals in Toronto